Colas Breugnon may refer to:

 Colas Breugnon (novel), the 1919 novel by Romain Rolland
 Colas Breugnon (opera), the 1938 opera by Dmitry Kabalevsky, based on Rolland's novel
 an orchestral suite by Tadeusz Baird on themes from the novel